Crininae is one of four subtribes within the tribe Amaryllideae (subfamily Amaryllidoideae, family Amaryllidaceae), with a pantropical distribution (Crinum) and also sub-Saharan Africa.

Description 
Leaves frequently show an intercalary meristem and are usually fringed with cartilaginous teeth. The leaf apices are also often truncate (cut off). The flowers may be actinomorphic to zygomorphic, with a perigone tube with free stamens. The fruit is indehiscent, irregular, and often rostellate (rosetted). The scape does not abscise (shed) during seed dispersal, with the exception of Ammocharis longifolia where it detaches at ground level. The seeds also lack an integument, but are endosperm-rich and partially chlorophyllous with cork-covering.

Taxonomy

Phylogeny 
Crininae are placed within Amaryllideae as follow:

These are phylogenetically related as follows:

Subdivision 
As circumscribed by Meerow et al. (2001), there were three genera (Species), although the precise relationship between Cybistetes and Amocharis has been problematic, having been segregated in 1939 but later restored in 2007, submerging Cybistetes within Ammocharis as A. longifolia:

Genera (species):
 Crinum (65)
 Ammocharis (6)

Distribution 
Widespread in the tropics (pantropical) and sub-Saharan Africa.

References

Bibliography 

 
 
 
 
 
 
 
 
 Katja Weiehhardt-Kulessa, Thomas Bórner, Jiirgen Sehmitz, Ute Müller-Doblies, and Dietrich Müller-Doblies. 2000. Controversial taxonomy of Strumariinae (Amaryllidaceae) investigated by nuclear rDNA (ITS) sequences. 1. Hessea, Namaquanula, Kamiesbergia, and Dewinterella. Plant Syst. Evol. 223:1-13 (2000)
  (online version)

External links 

Amaryllidoideae
Plant subtribes
Pantropical flora